Alireza Ghadiri (born 8 October 1979) is an Iranian football goalkeeper, currently playing for Saba.

Club career

Club career statistics

References

External links
 Alireza Ghadiri at Persian League

Living people
Iranian footballers
1979 births
Saba players
Tarbiat Yazd players
Sanat Mes Kerman F.C. players
Place of birth missing (living people)
Association football goalkeepers